Jacob Sacks is an American jazz pianist and composer.

Life and career
Sacks is originally from Michigan. He met drummer Dan Weiss at the Manhattan School of Music. Sacks was a finalist in the 1999 Thelonious Monk International Piano Competition, aged 22. Sacks was part of bassist Eivind Opsvik's quartet. Sacks has for a long time played in a trio with the bassist Thomas Morgan and drummer Dan Weiss, and in a duo with vocalist Yoon Sun Choi. Sacks has also played and recorded with harpsichord and other keyboard instruments.

Playing style
Nate Chinen of The New York Times commented that Sacks is "drawn to the subtler, deeper mechanics of harmony and form."

Compositions
Sacks "isn't averse to succinctness or simplicity as a composer".

Discography
An asterisk (*) indicates that the year is that of release.

As leader/co-leader

As sideman

References

External links
Interview with trombonist Jacob Garchik

American jazz pianists
American male pianists
Living people
21st-century American pianists
21st-century American male musicians
American male jazz musicians
Year of birth missing (living people)
The Delphian Jazz Orchestra members